Senaki is a district of Georgia, in the region of Samegrelo-Zemo Svaneti. Its main town is Senaki.

Population: 39,652 (2014 census)

Area: 521 km2

Politics
Senaki Municipal Assembly (Georgian: სენაკის საკრებულო) is a representative body in Senaki Municipality, consisting of 33 members which is elected every four years. The last election was held in October 2021. Vakhtang Gadelia of Georgian Dream was elected mayor through a 2nd round against a candidate of the United National Movement.

Senaki was one of just seven municipalities where ruling Georgian Dream lost its majority in the sakrebulo, five of which in Samegrelo.

A protracted local political crisis ensued over the election of the chairperson of the sakrebulo, eventually resulting in a majoritarian UNM council member to abandon his mandate, and the central election commission calling for a by-election in one of the districts. The election was boycotted by the opposition parties, resulting in the election of the Georgian Dream candidate with 96.7% on 1 October 2022, at the expense of a (former) UNM seat, tilting the balance of political power in the sakrebulo

Administrative divisions

Senaki municipality is administratively divided into one city, 14 communities (თემი, temi), and 61 villages (სოფელი, sopeli):

Cities
 Senaki

Communities
 Akhalsopeli
 Gejeti
 Ek'i
 Zani
 Zemo-Ch'aladidi
 Tek'lati
 Ledzadzame
 Menji
 Nosiri
 Nokalakevi
 Ushapati
 Potskho
 Dzveli Senak'i
 Khorshi

Twin towns – sister Municipalities

 Bila Tserkva, Ukraine 
 Rakvere, Estonia

See also
 List of municipalities in Georgia (country)

References

External links
 Districts of Georgia, Statoids.com

Municipalities of Samegrelo-Zemo Svaneti